The 1954 Railway Cup Hurling Championship was the 28th series of the inter-provincial hurling Railway Cup. Three matches were played between 21 February 1954 and 17 March 1954 to decide the title. It was contested by Connacht, Leinster, Munster and Ulster.

Munster entered the championship as the defending champions.

On 17 March 1954, Leinster won the Railway Cup after a 0-09 to 0-05 defeat of Leinster in the final at Croke Park, Dublin. It was their sixth Railway Cup title overall and their first title since 1941. The final, which had a record attendance of 49,023, was the first which failed to produce a goal from either team.

Results

Semi-finals

Final

Top scorers

Overall

Single game

Sources

 Donegan, Des, The Complete Handbook of Gaelic Games (DBA Publications Limited, 2005).

References

Railway Cup Hurling Championship
Railway Cup Hurling Championship